Robert Tsao (born 24 February 1947 ) is a Taiwanese businessman best known as the founder of United Microelectronics Corporation (UMC). He is also a fine arts critic and collector in his private life.

Early life 
Tsao was born in 1947 in Beijing. A year and a half later he moved with his family to Taiwan because his father had taken a job there teaching Mandarin as part of a Kuomintang (KMT) campaign of sinicization in the former Japanese colony. He was one of six siblings. He attended National Taiwan University majoring in electrical engineering and management.

Career 
After school he went to work at the Industrial Technology Research Institute (ITRI). He left ITRI to found UMC in 1980.

In 1988 he visited Beijing and met with Jiang Zemin.

In 2001, UMC moved into China by setting up Hejian Technology (Suzhou) Co. in Jiangsu. This led to Tsao being charged in 2005 with  violating the Business Entity Accounting Act. He was found not guilty in 2010.

Tsao became disillusioned with China following the 2019 Yuen Long attack. Tsao recounted "At that time, I had dinner with a top Chinese official. He told me the way to proceed was to hire hooligans to work with police officers to beat up protesters, then Hong Kongers would not defy the Chinese government.” The ensuing Yuen Long attack “showed the true face of the Chinese Communist Party, a hooligan regime conducting violence against ordinary people... If it cannot get its way, its solution is to hire hooligans to beat people up.” He had been living in Hong Kong at the time and following the attacks he vowed to leave stating “People in Hong Kong used peaceful means at street events to express their views, but the Chinese government used cruel means of suppression, including beatings. It really made me angry. So I decided to never go to China, Hong Kong or Macau again.”

Art collection 
Tsao is a noted art collector. He began collecting art in the 1990s with jadeite before expanding to archaic bronzes. After buying his first jade pieces Tsao did extensive research, discovering that all of the pieces he had bought were fakes.

In 2000, Tsao acquired a Qianlong period glass vase for a then record HK$24 million from Joseph Lau. In 2019 he sold the vase for HK$180 million.

Tsao was a patron of Zhu Dequn.

His collection is known as the Le Cong Tang collection.

Philanthropy 
In 2022, Tsao pledged one hundred million US dollars to Taiwan's Ministry of National Defense in the interest of "safeguarding freedom, democracy, and human rights." The pledge came as a response to Chinese military aggression following the 2022 US Congressional Delegation visit to Taiwan.

Personal life 
Tsao has two sons who hold Taiwanese citizenship.

In 2011, he moved to Singapore and renounced his Taiwanese citizenship.

In 2022, Tsao renounced his Singaporean citizenship and sought to reinstate his Taiwanese citizenship. He was reinstated as a Taiwan citizen and received his national identification card on 30 August 2022.

References 

Taiwanese businesspeople
Living people
Collectors of Asian art
Taiwanese people from Beijing
National Taiwan University alumni
1947 births